Vicdessos is a former commune in the Ariège department in southwestern France. On 1 January 2019, it was merged into the new commune Val-de-Sos.

Geography
The area of Vicdessos is about 6.01 km2 with a minimum elevation of 652 meters and a maximum elevation of 1585 meters.

Location
This Pyrenean town lies in the Natural regional park of Pyrenées ariégoises in the Vicdessos valley, at the feet of the Montcalm mountains.

Vicdessos is 15 km from Tarascon-sur-Ariège and 95 km from Toulouse.

Population
Inhabitants of Vicdessos are called Vicdessosiens.

See also
Communes of the Ariège department
Montcalm Massif

References

Former communes of Ariège (department)
Ariège communes articles needing translation from French Wikipedia
Populated places disestablished in 2019